The Galloway Township Public Schools are a community public school district that serves students in pre-kindergarten through eighth grade from Galloway Township, in Atlantic County, New Jersey, United States.

As of the 2018–19 school year, the district, comprising six schools, had an enrollment of 3,370 students and 300.5 classroom teachers (on an FTE basis), for a student–teacher ratio of 11.2:1.

The district is classified by the New Jersey Department of Education as being in District Factor Group "CD", the sixth-highest of eight groupings. District Factor Groups organize districts statewide to allow comparison by common socioeconomic characteristics of the local districts. From lowest socioeconomic status to highest, the categories are A, B, CD, DE, FG, GH, I and J.

Public school students in ninth through twelfth grades attend Absegami High School, located in the township. As of the 2018–19 school year, the high school had an enrollment of 1,153 students and 101.2 classroom teachers (on an FTE basis), for a student–teacher ratio of 11.4:1. Students in the western portion of the township have the option of attending Cedar Creek High School in neighboring Egg Harbor City under the school of choice program. Both high schools are part of the Greater Egg Harbor Regional High School District, a regional public high school district serving students from the constituent districts of Egg Harbor City, Galloway Township, Hamilton Township and Mullica Township. The district also serves students from the districts of the City of Port Republic and Washington Township (in Burlington County) as part of sending/receiving relationships.

History
In the mid-1990s the student body increased as new employees of casinos moved into the area with their children. The district reached its peak enrollment, 3,975, in the 2002–2003 school year, which it maintained for the subsequent year. Due to the decline in the casino industry, the district began losing students. From 2004 to 2014 enrollment declined by greater than 16%, specifically 639 pupils. Circa 2006 to 2016 the district's enrollment declined by 600 students.

From 2006 to 2016 there were 60 job cuts, with nine positions cut in 2016 alone. In 2010 the district proposed cutting 69 jobs. In 2010 the district had proposed closing both pre-kindergarten centers. Additionally between 2006 and 2010 it closed three schools. The numbers of English as a second language and special education students increased by 2016.

Schools
Schools in the district (with 2018–19 enrollment data from the National Center for Education Statistics) are:
Preschool
Pomona Preschool with 116 students in grades PreK
Dr. Donald Gross, Principal
It became preschool only in 2010.
Elementary schools
Arthur Rann Elementary School with 671 students in grades K-6
Kevin McGloin, Principal
It opened as an elementary school, became Arthur Rann Middle School (ARMS) at a later point, but changed back into an elementary school when the current middle school opened.
Reeds Road Elementary School with 560 students in grades K-6
Kevin Lightcap, Principal
Roland Rogers Elementary School with 563 students in grades K-6
Dr. Robin L. Moore, Principal
Smithville Elementary School with 634 students in grades K-6
David Ragazzi, Principal
Middle school
Galloway Township Middle School with 758 students in grades 7–8
It opened due to an increase of students in the 1990s. In 2000 it had about 900 students and it had about 990 in 2002.
Paula Junker, Principal

 Former schools
 Cologne Elementary School
 The student attendance boundaries changed in 2004 and it closed in 2005. It was smaller compared to most district schools.
 Oceanville Kindergarten Learning Center
 Formerly Oceanville School, which opened around 1927. It closed in 2010. The facility now houses GTPS facilities such as the food service department.
 South Egg Harbor Elementary School
 The student attendance boundaries changed in 2004 and it closed in 2005. It was smaller compared to most district schools.

Administration
Core members of the district's administration are:
Dr. Annette C. Giaquinto, Superintendent
Joy N. Nixon, Business Administrator / Board Secretary

Board of education
The district's board of education, with nine members, sets policy and oversees the fiscal and educational operation of the district through its administration. As a Type II school district, the board's trustees are elected directly by voters to serve three-year terms of office on a staggered basis, with three seats up for election each year held (since 2012) as part of the November general election. The board appoints a superintendent to oversee the day-to-day operation of the district.

References

External links
Galloway Township Public Schools

School Data for the Galloway Township Public Schools, National Center for Education Statistics
Greater Egg Harbor Regional High School District
Absegami High School website

Galloway Township, New Jersey
New Jersey District Factor Group CD
School districts in Atlantic County, New Jersey